My Louisiana Sky is a 1998 novel by Kimberly Willis Holt.

Plot summary
The novel is set in 1957, in the small town of Saitter, Louisiana, where 12-year-old Tiger Ann Parker lives with her mentally challenged parents. She tries to get the popular girl in her class, Abby Lynn Anders, to like her but fails because of one of her mother's childish outbursts. Because of this, Tiger isn't invited to Abby Lynn's pool party. Her best friend, Jesse Wade Thompson, tries to comfort her and kisses her. Startled, she rejects him and runs home.

When her beloved grandmother suddenly dies, Tiger faces the choice of either staying with her parents or moving in with her glamorous Aunt Dorie Kay in Baton Rouge.

Setting
Saitter is based on the author's hometown of Forest Hill, Louisiana.

Awards and honors

Film adaptation
In 2001, Hyperion and Showtime produced a successful film adaptation of My Louisiana Sky, starring Kelsey Keel as Tiger Ann Parker, Amelia Campbell as Corinna Ramsey Parker, Chris Owens as Lonnie Parker, Michael Cera as Jesse Wade, Shirley Knight as grandmother, and Juliette Lewis as Aunt Dorie Kay. The film was adapted by Anna Sandor and directed by Adam Arkin. The film was shot in Canada.

References

External links

IMDB listing for film version

1998 American novels
American children's novels
Novels set in Louisiana
American television films
2001 television films
2001 films
Films directed by Adam Arkin
Fiction set in 1957
Novels set in the 1950s
American novels adapted into films
Children's historical novels
1998 children's books
American novels adapted into television shows